Knut Hove (born 21 February 1946) is a Norwegian veterinarian.

He was born in Oslo. He took the dr.scient. degree in 1974, and the dr.med.vet. degree in 1978. In 1987 he was appointed as professor the Norwegian College of Agriculture. He became rector there in 2000; the institution changed its name to the Norwegian University of Life Sciences in 2005.

References

1946 births
Living people
Norwegian veterinarians
Academic staff of the Norwegian College of Agriculture
Academic staff of the Norwegian University of Life Sciences
Rectors of the Norwegian University of Life Sciences
People from Oslo in health professions